Alasdair John Milbank (born 23 October 1952) is an English Anglo-Catholic theologian and is an Emeritus Professor in the Department of Theology and Religious Studies at the University of Nottingham, where he is President of the Centre of Theology and Philosophy. Milbank previously taught at the University of Virginia and before that at the University of Cambridge and the University of Lancaster. He is also chairman of the trustees of the think tank ResPublica.

Milbank founded the radical orthodoxy movement. His work crosses disciplinary boundaries, integrating subjects such as systematic theology, social theory, ethics, aesthetics, philosophy, political theory, and political theology. He first gained recognition after publishing Theology and Social Theory in 1990, which laid the theoretical foundations for the movement which later became known as radical orthodoxy. In recent years he has collaborated on three books with philosopher Slavoj Žižek and Creston Davis, entitled Theology and the Political: The New Debate (2005), The Monstrosity of Christ: Paradox or Dialectic (2009), and Paul's New Moment: Continental Philosophy and the Future of Christian Theology (2010). Milbank delivered the Stanton Lectures at Cambridge in 2011. Milbank's friendship and substantial intellectual common ground with David Bentley Hart has been noted several times by both thinkers.

Life

Education
Following his secondary education at Hymers College, he received a Bachelor of Arts degree with third-class honours in modern history from The Queen's College, Oxford. He was awarded a postgraduate certificate in theology from Westcott House, Cambridge. During his time in Cambridge he studied under Rowan Williams. He then received his Doctor of Philosophy degree from the University of Birmingham. His dissertation on the work of Giambattista Vico, entitled "The Priority of the Made: Giambattista Vico and the Analogy of Creation", was written under the supervision of Leon Pompa. The University of Cambridge awarded him a senior Doctor of Divinity degree in recognition of published work in 1998.

Personal life
Milbank was born in Kings Langley, England, on 23 October 1952. 
He married Alison Milbank, also a lecturer at the University of Nottingham, in 1978.

Milbank is an avid Twitter user.

Thought and views

A key part of the controversy surrounding Milbank concerns his view of the relationship between theology and the social sciences. He argues that the social sciences are a product of the modern ethos of secularism, which stems from an ontology of violence. Theology, therefore, should not seek to make constructive use of secular social theory, for theology itself offers a peaceable, comprehensive vision of all reality, extending to the social and political without the need for a social theory based on some level of violence. (As Contemporary Authors summarises his thought, "the Christian mythos alone 'is able to rescue virtue from deconstruction into violent, agonistic difference.'") Milbank argues that metaphysics is inescapable and therefore ought to be critically dealt with. Milbank is sometimes described as a metaphysical theologian in that he is concerned with establishing a Christian trinitarian ontology. He relies heavily on aspects of the thought of Plato and Augustine, in particular the former's modification by the neoplatonist philosophers.

Milbank, together with Graham Ward and Catherine Pickstock, has helped forge a new trajectory in constructive theology known as radical orthodoxy – a predominantly Anglo-Catholic approach which is highly critical of modernity.

Implications

Milbank explicitly supports 'socialist' social organization.

He has been described as 'communitarian'.

Milbank, while criticising the notion of same-sex marriage as a strategy to "extension of a form of biopolitical tyranny", drew on James Alison to argue that "it is possible to recognise the legitimacy of faithful homosexual union without conceding that this is tantamount to marriage".

Reception
Paul Hedges of S. Rajaratnam School of International Studies, Nanyang Technological University stated in one 2014 Open Theology article that "John Milbank's Radical Orthodoxy employs styles of rhetoric and representation of the religious Other that have clear affinities" with "ideologies" of "religious extremism and fundamentalism". Hedges wrote that Milbank's "rhetoric and judgements" suggest that "his theology is at best unhelpful, and at worst potentially dangerous." Hedges simultaneously concedes that "a different approach can be detected in his most recent writings".

Nicholas Lash expressed reservations towards Milbank's views on the relation between "the sense of ‘power’ (Macht)" and "violence", and between "the Kingdom" and the Church.

See also
Theurgy#Radical orthodoxy

Bibliography

Books 
 Theology and Social Theory: Beyond Secular Reason, 1990 –
 The Religious Dimension in the Thought of Giambattista Vico, 1668–1744, 2 vols., 1991–92 – ( [pt. 1],  [pt. 2])
 The Mercurial Wood: Sites, Tales, Qualities, 1997 –
 The Word Made Strange, 1997 –
 Truth in Aquinas, with Catherine Pickstock, 2000 –
 Being Reconciled: Ontology and Pardon, 2003 –
 The Suspended Middle: Henri de Lubac and the Debate Concerning the Supernatural, 2005 –
 The Legend of Death: Two Poetic Sequences, 2008 –
 The Monstrosity of Christ: Paradox or Dialectic?, With Slavoj Žižek and Creston Davis, 2009 –
 The Future of Love: Essays in Political Theology, 2009 –
 Paul's New Moment: Continental Philosophy and the Future of Christian Theology, With Slavoj Žižek and Creston Davis, 2010 –
 Beyond Secular Order: The Representation of Being and the Representation of the People, 2013 –
 The Politics of Virtue: Post-Liberalism and the Human Future, With Adrian Pabst, 2016 –

Essays in edited volumes 
 "Postmodern Critical Augustinianism: A Short Summa in Forty-two Responses to Unasked Questions", found in The Postmodern God: A Theological Reader, edited by Graham Ward, 1997 –
 "The Last of the Last: Theology in the Church", found in Conflicting Allegiances: The Church-Based University in a Liberal Democratic Society, 2004 –
 "Alternative Protestantism: Radical Orthodoxy and the Reformed Tradition", found in Radical Orthodoxy and the Reformed Tradition: Creation, Covenant, And Participation, 2005 –
 "Plato versus Levinas: Gift, Relation and Participation", found in Adam Lipszyc, ed., Emmanuel Levinas: Philosophy, Theology, Politics (Warsaw: Adam Mickiewicz Institute, 2006), 130–144.
 "Sophiology and Theurgy: The New Theological Horizon", found in Adrian Pabst, ed., Radical Orthodoxy and Eastern Orthodoxy (Basingstoke: Ashgate, 2009), 45–85 –
 "Shari'a and the True Basis of Group Rights: Islam, the West, and Liberalism", found in Shari'a in the West, edited by Rex Ahdar and Nicholas Aroney, 2010 –
 "Platonism and Christianity: East and West", found in Daniel Haynes, ed., New Perspectives on Maximus (forthcoming)

Journal articles 
 "The Body by Love Possessed: Christianity and Late Capitalism in Britain", Modern Theology 3, no. 1 (October 1986): 35–65.
“Enclaves, or Where is the Church?”, New Blackfriars, Vol. 73, no. 861 (June,1992), pp. 341–352.
 "Can a Gift Be Given? Prolegomena to a Future Trinitarian Metaphysic", Modern Theology 11, no. 1 (January 1995): 119–161.
 "The Soul of Reciprocity Part One: Reciprocity Refused", Modern Theology 17, no. 3 (July 2001): 335–391.
 "The Soul of Reciprocity Part Two: Reciprocity Granted", Modern Theology 17, no. 4 (October 2001): 485–507.
 "Scholasticism, Modernism and Modernity", Modern Theology 22, no. 4 (October 2006): 651–671.
 "From Sovereignty to Gift: Augustine's Critique of Interiority", Polygraph 19 no. 20 (2008): 177–199.
 "The New Divide: Romantic versus Classical Orthodoxy Modern Theology", Modern Theology 26, no. 1 (January 2010): 26–38.
 "Culture and Justice", Theory, Culture and Society 27, no. 6 (2010): 107–124.

 "Hume Versus Kant: Faith, Reason and Feeling", Modern Theology 27, no. 2 (April 2011): 276–297.
 "Against Human Rights: Liberty in the Western Tradition", Oxford Journal of Law and Religion 1, no. 1 (2012): 203–234.
 "Dignity Rather than Right", Revista de filosofía Open Insight, v. IV, no. 7 (January 2014): 77-124.
 "Politics of the Soul", Revista de filosofía Open Insight, v. VI, no. 9 (January–June 2015): 91-108.
 "Reformation 500: Any Cause for Celebration?", "Open Theology" v. 4 (2018): 607–729. Open Access. DOI: Reformation 500: Any Cause for Celebration?

References

External links 

 Interview with John Milbank, 2005
 Interview with John Milbank, 2008
 "The Ethics of Self-Sacrifice" article in First Things (1999)
 Staff profile on the University of Nottingham website
 The Centre of Theology and Philosophy, of which Milbank is the president.
 "The Politics of Paradox" from the 2009 TELOS conference
 Lazarus Style Comeback, Times Higher Education, 16 April 2009

1952 births
20th-century Anglican theologians
20th-century English male writers
20th-century English theologians
21st-century Anglican theologians
21st-century Christian universalists
21st-century English male writers
21st-century English theologians
Academics of Lancaster University
Academics of the University of Nottingham
Alumni of The Queen's College, Oxford
Alumni of the University of Birmingham
Anglican philosophers
Anglican universalists
Anglo-Catholic socialists
Anglo-Catholic theologians
Christian universalist theologians
Christian continental philosophers and theologians
Converts to Anglicanism from Methodism
English Anglican theologians
English Anglo-Catholics
English Christian socialists
English male non-fiction writers
English philosophers
Fellows of Peterhouse, Cambridge
Living people
University of Virginia faculty
Writers from London
Political theologians
Giambattista Vico scholars